Saniya Lynn Chong (born June 27, 1994) is an American basketball player who is currently a free agent. She played her collegiate career for the University of Connecticut, where she won three national championships for the Huskies.

Prior to enrolling at UConn she played for Ossining High School in Ossining, New York.

Career statistics

College

Source

References

External links
 UConn player profile

1994 births
Living people
American women's basketball players
Basketball players from New York (state)
Dallas Wings draft picks
Dallas Wings players
Guards (basketball)
Parade High School All-Americans (girls' basketball)
People from Ossining, New York
UConn Huskies women's basketball players
American sportspeople of Chinese descent